Prudente may refer to:
Prudente de Morais (1841–1902), the third president of Brazil (the first civilian)
Nemesio Prudente (died 2008), Filipino political activist and university president
French ship Prudent, including ships named Prudente
HMS Prudente (1779), one of the ships mentioned above; captured by the British in 1779

See also
Philip II of Spain, known as Felipe el Prudente ("Philip the Prudent")